Yelü Lihu (耶律李胡) (911-960), also named Honggu (洪古), courtesy name Xiyin (奚隱), formally Emperor Zhangsu (章肅皇帝), was an imperial prince of the Khitan-led Liao dynasty. As the third son of Liao's founding emperor Emperor Taizu (Yelü Abaoji) and his wife Empress Shulü Ping, Yelü Lihu served as crown prince during the reign of his older brother Emperor Taizong (Yelü Deguang), who was their second son, as Empress Shulü wanted him to be emperor after Emperor Taizong.  However, after Emperor Taizong's death, their older brother Yelü Bei's son Yelü Ruan was able to defeat Yelü Lihu in battle and take the throne.  Yelü Lihu was put under arrest and later died while under arrest.

Early life 
Yelü Lihu was born in 911, as the third son of the first Liao emperor Yelü Abaoji and his wife Shulü Ping — after his older brothers Yelü Bei and Yelü Deguang.  Yelü Lihu was Lady Shulü's youngest son, although Yelü Abaoji would later have a younger son, Yelü Yaliguo (耶律牙里果), by a Lady Xiao.  (Yelü Abaoji would, in 916, claim the title of emperor, establishing the Liao dynasty.)

In Yelü Lihu's youth, he was said to be brave, strong, and ferocious, but was also cruel.  Even on minor things where people would anger him, he would punish those people by tattooing their faces or by throwing them into fire or water.  There was a time when Emperor Taizu observed his sons sleeping (apparently, together), with Yelü Lihu curled up and sleeping toward the inside.  He commented, "This must be a sign that he is lesser to the others."  There was also a time when it was extremely cold, when he told his sons to go out to fetch firewood.  Yelü Deguang, without being choosy about the kind of wood, grabbed the wood and returned quickly.  Yelü Bei selected the dry wood, bundled it up carefully, and then returned with the wood.  Yelü Lihu did not gather much wood and lost much on the way, and when he returned, he simply left the wood there and stood by.  Emperor Taizu commented, "The oldest is skillful, but the second is more capable.  The youngest is lesser than the others."  However, Empress Shulü favored Yelü Lihu.

During Emperor Taizong's reign 
Emperor Taizu died in 926.  After his death, Empress Shulü diverted the succession away from Yelü Bei, to Yelü Deguang, who took the throne as Emperor Taizong.  In 930, Emperor Taizong sent Yelü Lihu on an incursion into the territory of Khitan's southern neighbor Later Tang.  Yelü Lihu attacked Later Tang's Huan Prefecture (寰州, in modern Shuozhou, Shanxi), and returned with many captives.  Emperor Taizong thereafter created him crown prince and gave him the title of generalissimo of all armies.  (This designation of Yelü Lihu as crown prince apparently aggravated Yelü Bei further, as it was later that year that Yelü Bei fled to Later Tang.)  During Emperor Taizong's subsequent campaigns, Yelü Lihu was often put in charge of defending the capital Linhuang (臨潢, in modern Chifeng, Inner Mongolia).

In 936, Emperor Taizong launched a campaign to aid the Later Tang general Shi Jingtang (the brother-in-law of then-Later Tang emperor Li Congke) to overthrow Later Tang.  The campaign was successful, and Shi's new Later Jin replaced Later Tang as the ruling regime in central and northern China.  Shi remained submissive toward Khitan (whose state was then renamed Liao) and in 938 had his chancellors Feng Dao and Liu Xu visit Liao on a diplomatic mission, offering honorable titles to Emperor Taizong and Empress Dowager Shulü, including honoring Emperor Taizong as "father emperor" while Shi referred to himself as "son emperor."  Shi also often offered gifts to many key Liao generals and nobles, and Yelü Lihu, as crown prince, was the recipient of many of these gifts as well.  However, after Shi's death, his nephew and successor Shi Chonggui took a confrontational stance against Liao, causing Emperor Taizong to launch a major campaign against Later Jin in 946, destroying it.  During the campaign, Yelü Lihu presumably remained at Linhuang to defend it.

After Emperor Taizong's reign 
Emperor Taizong claimed imperial title over China as well, but soon tired of the many rebellions rising up against him throughout the former Later Jin realm.  He began a withdrawal back to Liao proper, but died on the way, near Heng Prefecture (恆州, in modern Shijiazhuang, Hebei).  As Empress Dowager Shulü had, when Emperor Taizu died, killed many chieftains so that she could bury them with Emperor Taizu, many of the Khitan generals feared that she would do the same thing again; they therefore resolved to support Yelü Bei's son Yelü Ruan the Prince of Yongkang as emperor.  Yelü Ruan was subsequently able to overpower the ethnically Han Chinese general Zhao Yanshou (who had designs on claiming imperial title himself) and take over Heng Prefecture, and then declared himself emperor (as Emperor Shizong).

However, knowing that Empress Dowager Shulü had intended for Yelü Lihu to succeed, Emperor Shizong decided to head back north to Liao proper in order to face off against his grandmother.  She sent Yelü Lihu with her army to face Emperor Shizong, but Yelü Lihu was defeated by Emperor Shizong's forward commanders Yelü Anduan (耶律安端, a younger brother of Emperor Taizu) and Yelü Liuge (耶律留哥).  Knowing that her cause was lost, Empress Dowager Shulü accepted the suggestion of the official Yelü Wuzhi (耶律屋質) and negotiated a peace agreement where she accepted Emperor Shizong as emperor.  Emperor Shizong subsequently had her placed under house arrest at Emperor Taizu's tomb, while Yelü Lihu was placed under house arrest at Zu Prefecture (祖州, in modern Chifeng).

In 960, Yelü Lihu's son Yelü Xiyin (耶律喜隱) plotted a rebellion against then-reigning Emperor Muzong (Emperor Taizong's son Yelü Jing).  As a result, both he and Yelü Lihu were arrested and placed in jail.  Yelü Lihu died in jail thereafter (although Yelü Xiyin did not and was subsequently released). However, Yelü Xiyin was killed in another rebellion, as well as his son with Lady Xiao.

Harem 
Consort and issue(s):
Empress Hejing, of the Xiao clan (和敬皇后蕭氏)
Yelü Xiyin, Prince of Song (宋王 耶律喜隱, d. 982), 1st son
Yelü Wan, Prince of Wei (衛王 耶律宛), 2nd son

In popular culture 
Portrayed by Wang Huichun in the 2020 Chinese TV series The Legend of Xiao Chuo.

Notes and references 

 History of Liao, vol. 72.
 Xu Zizhi Tongjian, vol. 1.

911 births
960 deaths
Liao dynasty imperial princes
Liao dynasty generals
Yelü clan
10th-century Khitan people